Juan Álvarez (1790–1867) was a Mexican general and 1855 president of Mexico.

Juan Álvarez or Juan Alvarez may also refer to:

Politics and law
 Juan Álvarez Mendizábal (1790–1853), Spanish economist and politician
 Juan Álvarez de Lorenzana, 10th Viscount of Barrantes (1818–1883), Spanish colonial politician
 Juan Álvarez (historian) (1878–1954), Argentine judge and historian

Sports

Association football (soccer)
 Juan Álvarez (footballer, born 1948), Mexican footballer
 Juan Carlos Álvarez (born 1954), Spanish football midfielder and manager
 Juan Álvarez (footballer, born February 1996), Argentine footballer, currently playing for Club Atlético Banfield
 Juan Álvarez (footballer, born July 1996), Mexican footballer, currently playing for C.F. Monterrey
 Juan Álvarez (footballer, born 1997), Argentine footballer, currently playing for Chacarita Juniors
 Juan Alvarez (soccer) (born 2004), American soccer player

Other sports
 Juan Alvarez (baseball) (born 1973), American Major League Baseball pitcher
 Juan Álvarez (rugby union) (born 1980), Uruguayan rugby union player
 Juan Cruz Álvarez (born 1985), Argentine race car driver

Others
 Juan Álvarez de Toledo (1488–1577), Spanish Dominican and cardinal
 Juan Álvarez de Eulate y Ladrón de Cegama (born 1583), Spanish colonialist
 Juan Álvarez (writer) (born 1978), Colombian short story writer
 Juan Manuel Álvarez (Glendale train crash) (born 1979), American convicted of causing the 2005 Glendale train crash
 Security Chief Juan Alvarez, a fictional character in The Moon Is a Harsh Mistress